Hi, Mom may refer to:

 Hi Mom, a (1957-1960) local morning childrens television show which aired on WRCA-TV (WNBC) in New York City, starring Shari Lewis
 Hi, Mom!, 1970 American film
 Hi, Mom (2021 film), 2021 Chinese film

See also
"Hello Mom", 1971 single by the Mercey Brothers